Richard Clarence "Rick" Tippe (born December 21, 1958) is a Canadian country music artist. Tippe has released seven albums on Moon Tan Music, including a greatest hits collection in 2000. His highest-charting single, "The Craziest Thing," peaked at No. 9 in 1996. He has won more than 25 awards from the British Columbia Country Music Association, including three consecutive Entertainer of the Year wins from 2001 to 2003. Tippe has toured across the United States, the United Kingdom and Australia, and opened for artists such as Tracy Byrd, Terri Clark, Mark Chesnutt and Sawyer Brown.

Biography
Rick Tippe is the son of Canadian Country Music Hall of Fame and British Columbia Country Music Association Hall of Fame inductee Elmer Tippe. He released his first EP, After All These Years, on Ric'n'Rol Music in 1992. Two years later, he released his first studio album, 1994's Should'a Seen Her Comin'''. The album produced six charting singles, including Tippe's first Top 20 song, "Two Broken Hearted Fools." Its follow-up, 1996's Get Hot or Go Home, produced another five Top 20 singles, including Tippe's highest-charting single, "The Craziest Thing." Tippe was named Male Vocalist of the Year by the BCCMA in 1996, his first of eight consecutive wins in the category.

Tippe's third studio album, Shiver 'n' Shake, was released in 1998. All four of its singles reached the Top 20 on the RPM Canadian country singles chart. Also in 1998, Tippe was named Independent Male Vocalist of the Year by the Canadian Country Music Association. Tippe's first greatest hits collection, The Best of Rick Tippe, was released in 2000. Proceeds from one of the album's singles, "Keepin' the Faith," have raised more than $25,000 for the Canadian Cancer Society. Tippe swept the 2001 BCCMA Awards, winning Entertainer of the Year, Male Vocalist of the Year, Album of the Year (The Best of Rick Tippe), Song of the Year ("Keepin' the Faith"), Single of the Year ("Keepin' the Faith") and the inaugural Video of the Year Award ("Keepin' the Faith").

Following the release of 2002's Singin' a Different Tune, Tippe took a break from recording. During his hiatus, he was commissioned by Mattel to write, produce and perform a song for the 35th anniversary of Hot Wheels. He began work on an album with his father, Elmer, in 2006. When Elmer suffered an unexpected stroke in November 2006, the project was put on hold. While his dad recovered, Tippe began work on his sixth studio album. His first album in six years, The Power of One'' was released in the summer of 2008. Its first single, "Long Way to Paradise," was released in September 2007.

On November 9, 2014, Rick Tippe was inducted into the BCCMA Hall of Fame.

Retirement

On August 12, 2011, Tippe performed his last concert, and one week later he opened a commercial truck repair company, Dynamic PowerTrain, with his two sons, Cameron and Tyler, in Maple Ridge.  In an August 30, 2014 interview with the Maple Ridge & Pitt Meadows Times, Tippe says his auto repair business is currently his main focus, leaving him little time for music.  "I hardly play the guitar, I hardly sing.  I don't have time," he says.  Tippe said he might get back into music again one day, but is unsure if it will happen.

Discography

Studio albums

Extended plays

Compilation albums

Singles

1990s

2000s

Notes
A^ "When You Say Jump" peaked at number 16 on the Canadian RPM Country Tracks chart.

Music videos

References

External links
Official Site
Official YouTube Channel

Canadian male singer-songwriters
Canadian country singer-songwriters
Living people
Musicians from British Columbia
1958 births